Dusmareb is the capital of Galmudug state in central Somalia. The city also serves as the administrative capital of the Galguduud province.

Historically, the city was known as Daar Dheer or simply Dardher but later in time the city's name changed to Dusamareb also spelled Dhusamareb.

Location
Dusamareb is 511 km from Mogadishu, the capital city of Somalia. The highway that connects the north and the south of the country goes through the city.  Dhusamareb has borders with El Buur to the east Guriceel to the south, Adado to north and Abudwak to the northwest. Generally it consist of 5 districts: Adado( north) Abduwaq(North east), Elbur( South East), Eeldheer( East) Galhareri( North East).

Demographics
As of 2016 the broader Dusmareb District had a population of 390,407 inhabitants. The city's population is from the Hiraab, Habar girdir of Hawiye sub-clans.

Education
There are many universities located across the City, the most prominent one being Dusmareb University which provides undergraduate degrees.

Transportation
Air transportation in Dusmareb is served by Dusmareb Airport.

Hospitals
Several health centers exist in the city, among them is Dusmareb General Hospital.

Neighborhoods
Dayax
Horseed
Waabari
Waxar Cade
Bulo oog

Notable residents
Dr. Abdiqasim Salad Hassan - 5th President of Somalia
Abdiweli Mohamed Ali Gaas - 15th Prime Minister of Somalia and Former President of Puntland
Abdi Farah Shirdon – 16th Prime Minister of Somalia
Ahmed Abdisalam Adan - Former Deputy of Prime Minister of Somalia
Sheikh Mohamed Shakir -  Chief Minister of Galmudug
Magool - Famous Somali singer
Hassan Dahir Aweys - Former Somali Military colonel and Former leader of Hizbul Islam
Aden Hashi Farah Aero - Former Leader of Al-Shabaab
Mahad Mohamed Salad - Somali senator and Former Minister of Presidential Affairs.
Abdulkadir Hersi Siyad (Yamyam) -  Poet and playwright
Shire Jama Ahmed - Somali Linguist

References

External links
Dusmareb: Somalia
Radio Dusmareb, Radio and online News site

Populated places in Galguduud
Populated places in Somalia
Cities in Somalia

Galmudug